Treaty of Stralsund may refer to:

 Treaty of Stralsund (1354)
 Treaty of Stralsund (1370)